Spring Mills High School is the fourth high school in the Berkeley County, West Virginia school system, which opened in fall of 2013. On opening, the student body was formed from about one-half of the student body of each of Martinsburg High School and Hedgesville High School, which had become overcrowded. The current principal is Bo Nehr, who served as state senator years prior.

The school was officially dedicated by officials including West Virginia governor Earl Ray Tomblin on August 7, 2013.

Mascot 
The school's mascot is the Cardinals and its colors are cardinal red, white, and navy blue.

Orchestra Program 
Spring Mills High is unique in Berkeley County by having an orchestra program. It is home to the Spring Mills High School String Orchestra. Each year, members of the orchestra travel to West Virginia University in Morgantown to participate in the WVU Honors Orchestra.

References

Public high schools in West Virginia
Schools in Berkeley County, West Virginia